André Bessette, C.S.C. (9 August 1845 – 6 January 1937), more commonly known as Brother André, and since his canonization as Saint André of Montreal, was a lay brother of the Congregation of Holy Cross and a significant figure of the Catholic Church among French-Canadians, credited with thousands of reported miraculous oil healings associated with his pious devotion to Saint Joseph.

Bessette was declared venerable in 1978 and was beatified by Pope John Paul II in 1982. Pope Benedict XVI approved the decree of sainthood for Bessette on 19 February 2010, with the formal canonization taking place on 17 October 2010. He is the first Canadian living after Confederation to be canonized.

Early life
His father, Isaac Bessette, was a carpenter and lumberman, while his mother, Clothilde Foisy Bessette, saw to the education of the children. Bessette was the eighth of 12 children, four of whom died in infancy. At birth, Bessette was so frail that the curé baptized him "conditionally" in an emergency ritual the following day. In 1849, with employment scarce and his family living in poverty, Bessette's father moved to Farnham, Quebec to work as a lumberman, but was shortly thereafter killed by a falling tree. Bessette was nine years old, and his mother, at 40, remained with ten children in her care. Clothilde died of tuberculosis within three years, and Bessette became orphaned at the age of twelve.

According to Laurent Boucher, author of the book Brother André: the Miracle Man of Mount Royal, Bessette was placed under the care of Timothée and Rosalie Nadeau of Saint-Césaire, Quebec following his mother's death. While with the Nadeau family, Bessette attended catechetical lessons taught by his parish's pastor, André Provençal. It was during these lessons that Bessette developed his two lifelong devotions: Saint Joseph and the Passion of Christ. In June 1858, at age 12, Bessette was confirmed by Bishop Jean-Charles Prince of the Diocese of Saint-Hyacinthe. When Bessette was 14, the Nadeau's began to send him to school. However, Bessette was soon removed from school, having only learned to read and sign his name, both with difficulty. Timothée Nadeau intended to train Bessette as a labourer, seeing no need for an orphan to be educated. Bessette soon left the Nadeaus and was brought in by Louis Ouimet, the mayor of Saint-Césaire. While living with the Ouimet family, Bessette had a series of short-lived occupations, working as a farmer, tinsmith, blacksmith, wheelwright, cobbler, and baker, all of which Bessette was too physically weak to sustain. Searching for work, Bessette moved to Moosup, Connecticut at the age of 18, where he joined several of his relatives in work at textile mills across Connecticut and Rhode Island. Bessette returned to Canada in 1867 following the Canadian Confederation.

Call to devotion

The pastor of his parish, André Provençal, noticed the devotion and generosity of the young man. He decided to present Bessette to the Congregation of Holy Cross in Montreal, writing a note to the superior, "I'm sending you a saint." Although he was initially rejected by the order because of frail health, Archbishop Ignace Bourget of Montreal intervened on his behalf, and in 1872, Bessette was accepted and entered the novitiate of the congregation, receiving the religious name of Brother André, by which he was known for the rest of his life.  He made his final vows on February 2, 1874, at the age of 28.

"André was given the task of porter at Collège Notre-Dame in Côte-des-Neiges, Quebec, with additional duties as sacristan, laundry worker and messenger. "When I joined this community, the superiors showed me the door, and I remained 40 years," he said."

"His great confidence in Saint Joseph inspired him to recommend the saint's devotion to all those who were afflicted. On his many visits to the sick in their homes, he would rub the sick person lightly with oil taken from a lamp burning in the college chapel and recommend them in prayer to Saint Joseph."

People claimed that they had been cured through the prayers of Bessette and Saint Joseph, and they were grateful their prayers had been heard. Bessette steadfastly refused to take any credit for these cures. Bessette's desire to see Saint Joseph honoured led him in 1904 to launch a campaign to build a chapel for that purpose.

"When an epidemic broke out at a nearby college, André volunteered to nurse. Not one person died. The trickle of sick people to his door became a flood. His superiors were uneasy; diocesan authorities were suspicious; doctors called him a quack. "I do not cure," he said again and again. "Saint Joseph cures." In the end he needed four secretaries to handle the 80,000 letters he received each year."

As tensions increased at the college with so many of the sick coming to see the porter, the school officials decided that Bessette could no longer continue with his ministry. He was permitted to receive the sick in the nearby tramway station rather than the college. As his reputation spread, Bessette became quite a controversial figure. There were many religious in the Congregation of Holy Cross, teachers and parents of students at the College who supported him but many others opposed him and even considered him dangerous to the well-being of the school's reputation because they regarded him as a charlatan. Others were concerned for the good health of the children, fearing the possibility of contagion in the school spread from diseases carried by the sick who frequented Bessette.

In 1924 construction of a basilica named Saint Joseph's Oratory began on the side of the mountain, near Bessette's chapel.

Death and path to canonization

Bessette died in 1937, at the age of 91. One million people filed past his coffin.

The remains of Bessette lie in the church he helped build. His body lies in a tomb built below the Oratory's Main Chapel, except for his heart, which is preserved in a reliquary in the same Oratory. The heart was stolen in March 1973, but was recovered in December 1974 with the help of criminal lawyer Frank Shoofey .

Bessette was beatified by Pope John Paul II on May 23, 1982. The miracle cited in support of his beatification was the healing in 1958 of Giuseppe Carlo Audino, who suffered from cancer. 
Saint Andre is commemorated in most of the world by an optional memorial on January 6. His memorial is celebrated in Canada on January 7.

On December 19, 2009, Pope Benedict XVI promulgated a decree recognizing a second miracle at Bessette's intercession, and on October 17, 2010, formally declared sainthood for him. Bessette was the first saint of the Congregation of Holy Cross, the same religious order that founded the University of Notre Dame.

Legacy

Andre Hall houses the School of Humanities at St. Edward's University, a Holy Cross school, in Austin, Texas. is named in his honour.

There is a high school built on Fanshawe Park Rd in northwest London, Ontario Canada called Saint Andre Bessette Secondary School.

A program to support student learning at Notre Dame College Prep in Niles, Illinois, is named after Saint Andre. Students in the program are known as St. Andre Scholars.

There is an elementary school, Brother André Catholic School, in Beacon Heights (a suburb of Ottawa), Ontario, Canada. Another elementary school in Brampton, Ontario is called St. Andre Bessette.

The French Catholic mission in York Region - North of Toronto - is named "Mission Catholique St-Frère-André". Services are held at the region's only French Catholic High School: ÉSC Renaissance.

A Roman Catholic church named St. André Bessette will be opening soon in Vaughan, Ontario. It is now under construction.

St. André Bessette Parish is located in Laconia, New Hampshire; a small New England city with strong French Canadian Heritage.

St. André Bessette Catholic Church is a bilingual church (Spanish, English) located in Ecorse, Michigan.

St André Bessette Catholic Church is located in Downtown Portland, Oregon. Its former name was Downtown Chapel.

St André Bessette Catholic Church is a church located in Wilkes-Barre, Pennsylvania Wilkes-Barre, Pennsylvania.

There is a Catholic high school called St. André Bessette Catholic High School in Fort Saskatchewan, Alberta, serving students in grades 9-12.

St. André French Immersion Catholic Elementary School in Tecumseh, Ontario was opened in 2015 by the Windsor-Essex Catholic District School Board.

A mission station in Cadiz City, Philippines was named in his honor.

André House is a ministry to the homeless and poor populations of the Phoenix area.

Brother André's Café, a coffee shop housed at Epiphany Roman Catholic Church in Pittsburgh, PA, employs workers with intellectual and developmental disabilities.

Bibliography
 Joel Schorn, God's Doorkeepers: Padre Pio, Solanus Casey and André Bessette: Servant Publications, (September 30, 2006), 
 Laurent Boucher, c.s.c., Brother André: the miracle man of Mount Royal: Montreal, 1997, 329 p.
 Lafrenière, Bernard, c.s.c., Brother André. According to the Witnesses, Montreal, St. Joseph 's Oratory, 1997, 212 p.
 Henri-Paul Bergeron, Brother André, Apostle of Saint Joseph: Montreal 1958
 Katherine Burton, Brother André of Mount-Royal, USA: The Ave Maria press, 1942, 310 pages

Media 
 Brother André still with us: Le Centre Saint-Pierre and Saint Joseph's Oratory of Mount-Royal, 2004 (1 DVD - 62 minutes)
 The Greatness and Beauty of Saint Joseph's Oratory of Mount Royal: Montreal, Les Productions de la Montagne and Saint Joseph's Oratory of Mount Royal, 1995 (1 DVD, color, 26 minutes)
 By Jean-Claude Labrecque: Brother André: Montreal, Les Productions de la Montagne, 1987 (Movie, on 1 DVD, color, 88 minutes)
 God's Doorkeeper: St. André of Montreal, 2010
Bible

References

External links

 Blessed Brother André Bessette, C.S.C.  — Short Biography on the Holy Cross Brothers site.

1845 births
1937 deaths
People from Montérégie
People from Montreal
Congregation of Holy Cross
Burials in Quebec
Beatifications by Pope John Paul II
Canonizations by Pope Benedict XVI
19th-century Christian saints
20th-century Christian saints
Canonized Roman Catholic religious brothers
Miracle workers
Canadian Roman Catholic saints